Adams Fork is a stream in Howard County, Missouri.

Adams Fork most likely derives its name from the surname Adams.

See also
List of rivers of Missouri

References

Rivers of Howard County, Missouri
Rivers of Missouri
Missouri water resource region